Akhtar ul Islam is a Pakistani Olympian Field Hockey player who played in the Pakistan National team from 1967 to 1975. He is best known for scoring the goal at the final of the first Hockey World Cup held in Spain in 1971. This goal proved to be the decider of the game, providing Pakistan the win and setting the milestone of being the first nation to win the World Cup.

Akhtar ul Islam was positioned in the defensive line, being known as “the lion” due to his strong built, making it difficult for opposing team members to make their way past him.

In 2006 he was appointed the General Secretary of the Pakistan Hockey Federation and later on a Selector for Pakistan Hockey Team.

Akhtar ul Islam is the younger brother of another hockey player Khursheed Aslam.

References 

Pakistani male field hockey players
Year of birth missing (living people)
Living people
Place of birth missing (living people)
Asian Games medalists in field hockey
Field hockey players at the 1970 Asian Games
Asian Games gold medalists for Pakistan
Medalists at the 1970 Asian Games